Stacey Carr (born 6 April 1984 in Ashburton) is a field hockey midfielder from New Zealand, who made her international debut for the national team in 2003 at a three nations tournament in Japan. Carr was a member of the team that finished seventh at the 2004 Summer Olympics in Athens, Greece.

International senior competitions
 2004 – Olympic Qualifying Tournament, Auckland
 2004 – Summer Olympics, Athens
 2004 – Champions Trophy, Rosario
 2005 – Champions Challenge, Virginia Beach
 2006 – Commonwealth Games, Melbourne
 2006 – World Cup Qualifier, Rome
 2006 – Champions Trophy, Amstelveen
 2008 – Olympic Games, Beijing

External links
 
 Profile on New Zealand Hockey Federation

1984 births
Living people
New Zealand female field hockey players
Field hockey players at the 2004 Summer Olympics
Field hockey players at the 2006 Commonwealth Games
Field hockey players at the 2008 Summer Olympics
Field hockey players at the 2010 Commonwealth Games
Olympic field hockey players of New Zealand
Commonwealth Games silver medallists for New Zealand
Sportspeople from Ashburton, New Zealand
Commonwealth Games medallists in field hockey
20th-century New Zealand women
21st-century New Zealand women
Medallists at the 2010 Commonwealth Games